Events from the year 1335 in the Kingdom of Scotland.

Incumbents
 Monarch – David II

Events
 30 July – Battle of Boroughmuir, Scots victory
 30 November – Battle of Culblean, decisive Bruce loyalist victory

Deaths 
David III Strathbogie, 14th-century Anglo-Scottish noble (born 1309)
John de Lindsay, 14th-century bishop of Glasgow.

See also

 Timeline of Scottish history

References

 
Years of the 14th century in Scotland
Wars of Scottish Independence